"Just Another Love" is a song written by Paul Davis, and recorded by American country music artist Tanya Tucker.  It was released in June 1986 as the second single from the album Girls Like Me.

Success
The song was Tucker's seventh No. 1 on the Billboard Hot Country Singles chart.   The song stayed in the Top 40 of the Hot Country Singles chart for 14 weeks.  "Just Another Love' was Tanya Tucker's first No. 1 hit in 10 years, since "Here's Some Love" went to number one in October 1976.

Chart performance

References

1986 songs
Tanya Tucker songs
1986 singles
Songs written by Paul Davis (singer)
Capitol Records Nashville singles
Song recordings produced by Jerry Crutchfield